Class of '55: Memphis Rock & Roll Homecoming is a collaborative studio album by Carl Perkins, Jerry Lee Lewis, Roy Orbison, and Johnny Cash. It was released on May 26, 1986, by America/Smash Records, a subsidiary of Polygram Records. The album was produced by Chips Moman.

While the album was in part a tribute to Elvis Presley, it was mainly a commemoration of those young performing hopefuls, the four album participants, who — as had Presley — all began their careers with Sun Records in the 1950s. Recorded at Sam Phillips' Sun Studios and completed at American Sound Studios, the album was documented by Dick Clark Productions, which filmed it from start to finish; by The Commercial Appeal, the Mid-South's largest circulation newspaper; and by Nine-O-One Network Magazine, the first edition of which was sold with the album in a telemarketing package.

The final song of the session, "Big Train (from Memphis)", written by John Fogerty, includes the blended voices of John Fogerty, The Judds, Dave Edmunds, Ricky Nelson, Sam Phillips, and June Carter Cash. Fogerty told a reporter that he was thinking about the old Sun Records sound when he wrote the song. The extended finale of the song features the singers singing lines from various Sun Records songs, including "That's All Right Mama", "Blue Suede Shoes," "Whole Lotta Shakin' Goin' On", "Folsom Prison Blues" and others.

Producer Chips Moman encountered a major issue following the recording sessions, as Cash was still under contract to Columbia Records at the time and proper permissions had not been obtained. Faced with the possibility of having to remove Cash's voice from the recordings, Moman paid Columbia $100,000 for the rights to keep Cash on the record. At this time, the America/Smash label was affiliated with PolyGram, which in turn also owned Mercury Records to which Cash would sign shortly after recording Class of '55.

The recorded "Interviews from the Class of '55 Recording Sessions," written and produced by Rose Clayton, earned the 1986 Grammy Award for Best Spoken Word Album for the four performers, plus for producer Chips Moman, Sam Phillips and Ricky Nelson. For Nelson, it was his last recording session and only Grammy Award of his career.

A music video from Perkins' "Birth of Rock and Roll," starring Perkins, Lewis, and Ron Wood of The Rolling Stones, promoted the "Class Of '55."

Cash, Lewis and Perkins had previously collaborated in 1956 with the Million Dollar Quartet and in 1982 with The Survivors Live.

Dick Clark hosted a TV special with footage of the studio sessions aired on TBS in 1989.

After being out of print for decades, the album was re-released separately and as part of the Cash box set “The Complete Mercury Recordings: 1986-1991.”

Track listing

Personnel 
 Johnny Cash — vocals, rhythm guitar
 Carl Perkins — vocals, rhythm guitar, lead guitar
 Jerry Lee Lewis — vocals, piano
 Roy Orbison — vocals
 Jack Clement, Marty Stuart — background vocals, guitar
 Reggie Young, Bob Wootton, Kenneth Lovelace, J. R. Cobb — guitar
 Memphis Strings — strings
 Ace Cannon, Wayne Jackson, Jack Hale, Jr., Bob Lewin — horns
 Bobby Emmons — keyboards, Synclavier
 Mike Leech, Bob Moore — bass
 Gene Chrisman, WS Holland, Buddy Harman — drums
 Toni Wine, Paul Davis, Dan Penn, Rebecca Evans, Chips Moman, Reba Russell - backing vocals
 Sam Philips, June Carter Cash, John Fogerty, Dave Edmunds, The Judds, Rick Nelson — backing vocals on "Big Train (From Memphis)"

Charts
Album - Billboard (United States)

References 

1986 albums
Roy Orbison albums
Johnny Cash albums
Carl Perkins albums
Jerry Lee Lewis albums
Albums produced by Chips Moman
Albums recorded at Sun Studio
Collaborative albums
Rockabilly albums
PolyGram albums